WQST can refer to:

 WQST (AM), a defunct radio station (850 AM) formerly licensed to Forest, Mississippi, United States
 WQST-FM, a radio station (92.5 FM) licensed to Forest, Mississippi